FIELDATA (also written as Fieldata) was a pioneering computer project run by the US Army Signal Corps in the late 1950s that intended to create a single standard (as defined in MIL-STD-188A/B/C) for collecting and distributing battlefield information. In this respect it could be thought of as a generalization of the US Air Force's SAGE system that was being created at about the same time.

Unlike SAGE, FIELDATA was intended to be much larger in scope, allowing information to be gathered from any number of sources and forms. Much of the FIELDATA system was the specifications for the format the data would take, leading to a character set that would be a huge influence on ASCII a few years later. FIELDATA also specified the message formats and even the electrical standards for connecting FIELDATA-standard machines together.

Another part of the FIELDATA project was the design and construction of computers at several different scales, from data-input terminals at one end, to theatre-wide data processing centers at the other. Several FIELDATA-standard computers were built during the lifetime of the project, including the transportable MOBIDIC from Sylvania, and the BASICPAC and LOGICPAC from Philco. Another system, ARTOC, was intended to provide graphical output (in the form of photographic slides), but was never completed.

Because FIELDATA did not specify codes for interconnection and data transmission control, different systems (like "STANDARD FORM", "COMLOGNET Common language code", "SACCOMNET (465L) Control Code") used different control functions. Intercommunication between them was difficult.

FIELDATA is the original character set used internally in UNIVAC computers of the 1100 series, each six-bit character contained in six sequential bits of the 36-bit word of that computer. The direct successor to the UNIVAC 1100 is the Unisys 2200 series computers, which used FIELDATA  (although ASCII is now also common with each character encoded in 1/4 of a word, or 9 bits). Because some of the FIELDATA characters are not represented in ASCII, the Unisys 2200 uses '^', '"' and '_' characters for codes 004oct, 076oct and 077oct respectively.

The FIELDATA project ran from 1956 until it was stopped during a reorganization in 1962.

FIELDATA characters

Military

UNIVAC 
The code version used on the UNIVAC was based on the second half (primary code) of the military version with some changes.

Character map

Military version
Various other variants exist, with in some cases dramatic differences in the supervisory code (the first four rows 0–3). The letters in the first two rows are intended for use in "alphabetic supervisory information".

UNIVAC version
The code version used on the UNIVAC was based on the second half (6-bit primary code) of the military version with some changes.

Footnotes

References and further reading
 
 
 
   
 
 
 

Character sets
Early computers